In 2015 John McEnroe and Patrick McEnroe were the defending champions, but were eliminated in the round-robin stage.

Guy Forget and Henri Leconte won the title, defeating Cédric Pioline and Mark Woodforde in the final, 4–6, 7–6(7–5), [10–3].

Draw

Final

Group C
Standings are determined by: 1. number of wins; 2. number of matches; 3. in three-players-ties, percentage of sets won, or of games won; 4. steering-committee decision.

Group D
Standings are determined by: 1. number of wins; 2. number of matches; 3. in three-players-ties, percentage of sets won, or of games won; 4. steering-committee decision.

References
Main Draw

Legends Over 45 Doubles